Eduard Alexandrovich Khrennikov (born 19 May 1973 in Usolye-Sibirskoye) is a Russian ski-orienteering competitor and world champion, and three times winner of the overall World cup. He received a gold medal in the long course at the 2004, 2005 and 2007 World Ski Orienteering Championships, in the middle distance in 2002 and 2007, and in sprint in 2004 and 2007. He won the overall World Cup in Ski Orienteering in 2000, 2003 and 2006, and finished 3rd in 2001. Khrennikov by winning the middle distance at the 2017 Winter Military World Games in Sochi, Russia won his fifth medal in this competition. He continued winning three more gold medals there.

External links
Profile on IOF

References

1973 births
Living people
People from Usolye-Sibirskoye
Russian orienteers
Male orienteers
Ski-orienteers
Sportspeople from Irkutsk Oblast
21st-century Russian people